Richard Gay (born 9 March 1969) is an English former professional rugby league footballer who played in the 1980s, 1990s and 2000s.

Background
Richard Gay was born in Kingston upon Hull, East Riding of Yorkshire, England, he has worked as a Physical education teacher, he has worked as a supply teacher, he has worked at Sydney Smith School (closed since 31 August 2014), First Lane, Anlaby, Kingston upon Hull. and as of 2014 he runs his own business named Waterworld that provides swimming lessons to children that is run from a purpose-built pool at his house.

Playing career

International honours
Richard Gay won caps for England while at Hull in 1995 against Wales, and France.

Premiership Final appearances
Richard Gay played  and scored a try in Hull FC's 14-4 victory over Widnes in the Premiership Final during the 1990–91 season at Old Trafford, Manchester on Sunday 12 May 1991.

Club career
Richard Gay was transferred from Hull F.C. to the Castleford Tigers on 25 March 1996.

References

External links
 (archived by web.archive.org) Stats → Past Players → G at hullfc.com
 (archived by web.archive.org) Profile at hullfc.com
Search for "Richard Gay" at britishnewspaperarchive.co.uk
Richard Gay Memory Box Search at archive.castigersheritage.com
Richard Memory Box Search at archive.castigersheritage.com
Gay Memory Box Search at archive.castigersheritage.com

1969 births
Living people
Castleford Tigers players
England national rugby league team players
English rugby league players
Schoolteachers from Yorkshire
Hull F.C. players
Rugby league fullbacks
Rugby league players from Kingston upon Hull
Rugby league wingers
St. George Dragons players